Destra may refer to:

People
Destra Garcia, female singer, songwriter and soca artiste from Trinidad and Tobago
Tony Destra, (1954-1987), American drummer

Politics
La Destra ('The Right'), a conservative Italian political party
Destra Liberale Italiana (DLI) 'Italian Liberal Right', a tiny Italian political party

Others
Destra Corporation, an Australian company
Mano Destra, a 1986 lesbian art film